Sacred Heart Schools, Angadikadavu is a K-12, mixed, government aided school under the Archdiocese of Thalassery. The campus includes Parish Church, Higher Secondary section, High school section, Primary school section and Kindergarten. It is located at a hillside town, Angadikadavu, 15 kilometres away from Iritty town and 60 kilometres away from both the cities Kannur and Thalassery equally. The school is working under the AEO of Iritty.

Notable alumni

References

 
 
 
 

Christian schools in Kerala
Primary schools in Kerala
High schools and secondary schools in Kerala
Schools in Kannur district